Union Hospital may refer to:
 Union Hospital (Gauteng), Alberton, Gauteng, South Africa
 Union Hospital (Hong Kong), Tai Wai, Shatin, Hong Kong
 Union Hospital (Indiana), Terre Haute, Indiana, United States
 Union Hospital (Maryland), Elkton, Maryland, United States
 Union Hospital (Massachusetts), Lynn, Massachusetts, United States
 Union Hospital (Massachusetts), New Bedford, Massachusetts, United States
 Union Hospital (New Jersey), Union, New Jersey, United States
 Union Hospital (California), Benicia, California, United States

Trauma centers